Sarah Ogoke (born 25 June 1990) is a Nigerian-American basketball player for Ferroviário de Maputo and the Nigerian national team.

She participated at the 2017 Women's Afrobasket and 2019 Women's Afrobasket  . Ogoke was also a member of Nigeria's female basketball team, D'tigress, at the 2018 FIBA Women's Basketball World Cup in Tenerife, Canary Islands, Spain.

References

External links

1990 births
Living people
Citizens of Nigeria through descent
Nigerian women's basketball players
Shooting guards
Competitors at the 2011 All-Africa Games
African Games bronze medalists for Nigeria
African Games medalists in basketball
African Games silver medalists for Nigeria
Nigerian expatriate basketball people in Angola 
Nigerian expatriate basketball people in Portugal
Nigerian expatriate basketball people in Mozambique
Nigerian expatriate basketball people in Spain
Sportspeople from the Bronx
Basketball players from New York City
American women's basketball players
Southern Polytechnic State University
American expatriate basketball people in Angola
American expatriate basketball people in Portugal
American expatriate basketball people in Mozambique
American expatriate basketball people in Spain
African-American basketball players
American sportspeople of Nigerian descent
Nigerian people of African-American descent
American emigrants to Nigeria
21st-century African-American sportspeople
African-American sportswomen